National Circus Project is a 501(c)(3) not-for-profit educational organization in the United States. The organization was founded in 1984 by JeanPaul Jenack and  Meryl Shaffer to teach circus skills in school, as a way to combine physical movement and the arts.

Program specialists are recruited from the professional circus world, variety arts and educational organizations, such as physical education colleges and the Academy of Circus Arts in the UK. On May 22, 1990, the United States House of Representatives issued a commendation to the National Circus Project for "helping to further the cause of international understanding" through an international artist exchange program, bringing artists from China, England, Australia, Latvia, and Russia.

Statistics
Total show audience - 3,558,290
Total student/camper performances - 784
Total student/camp audience- 307,440
Total circus workshops - 55,068 
Total circus workshops participants - 1,974,256
Total participants - 5,839,683

References

External links
National Circus Project website
US Embassy Article on Moscow Visit
George A. Jackson ES 2008 Student Circus Video

Circus-related organizations
Circus schools